This is a bibliography of works by Bernard Malamud.

Novels

Collections

Short stories

Bibliographies by writer
Bibliographies of American writers